Santa Rosa, California's Cultural Heritage Board recommends sites for Designated Landmark status. The City Council makes the final decisions regarding designations.

Santa Rosa's designations are independent of state and federal designations;  the Luther Burbank Home & Gardens however is also designated a California Historical Landmark and as a U.S. National Historic Landmark (and therefore is also listed on the National Register of Historic Places. The County of Sonoma's historic landmark designations intentionally exclude sites within the cities in the County.

List of Santa Rosa historic landmarks

See also
List of National Historic Landmarks in California
California Historical Landmarks in Sonoma County, California

References 

Lists of buildings and structures in California
Lists of places in California
landmarks